Tony Wilds may refer to:

Tony Wilds (priest), Archdeacon of Plymouth.
Tony Wilds (umpire), Australian cricket umpire.